Lynda Myles may refer to:

 Lynda Myles (British producer) (born 1947), British writer and producer
 Lynda Myles (American writer) (born 1939), American writer and actress